Chloeta (or Topsy) is a community located on State Highway 20 in Delaware County, Oklahoma, United States, north of Spavinaw Lake. The post office existed from April 18, 1898, until January 31, 1914.

Sources
Shirk, George H. Oklahoma Place Names. Norman: University of Oklahoma Press, 1987.  .

Unincorporated communities in Delaware County, Oklahoma
Unincorporated communities in Oklahoma